Annie Zaidi (born 1978) is an English-language writer from India. Her novel, Prelude To A Riot, won the Tata Literature Live! Awards for Book of the Year 2020. In 2019, she won The Nine Dots Prize for her work Bread, Cement, Cactus and in 2018 she won The Hindu Playwright Award for her play, Untitled-1. Her non-fiction debut, a collection of essays, Known Turf: Bantering with Bandits and Other True Tales, was short-listed for the Vodafone Crossword Book Award in 2010.

She also writes poetry (Crush, 2007), short stories (The Good Indian Girl, 2011 and Love Story # 1 To 14, 2012), plays (Jam, Jaal etcetera) and has written a novella (Gulab, 2014).

Early life and education 
Zaidi was born in Allahabad and raised in Rajasthan. She and her older brother were raised by their mother Yasmin Zaidi, who became a school teacher and principal. Her mother wrote poetry and her grandfather was recognized for his contributions to Urdu literature with a national award. Her maternal grandfather is Padma Shri laureate Urdu writer and scholar Ali Jawad Zaidi. Zaidi has said that as a child, she used time recuperating from a leg fracture to read 200 books.  

Zaidi obtained her B.A. degree from Sophia College in Ajmer. During her time there, she wrote plays for the college cultural festivals and wrote poetry.  After her graduation, she joined the journalism course at Xavier Institute of Communications in Mumbai.

Journalism career 
After college, Zaidi began her career as a journalist. She first worked for a website, and then as a reporter for Mid-Day. After two years, she quit for several months to write poetry, but then went to work for Frontline in 2005. While working at Frontline, she also began her blog titled Known Turf, which later became the basis for a published essay collection.

In January 2008, Rouge, a supplement of the Times of India, named Zaidi on a list of Women (under 30) to Watch Out For. In 2013, she wrote "An Open Letter to Honey Singh," criticizing the abusive and objectifying content of Yo Yo Honey Singh's lyrics and videos. 

She has written for several publications including Caravan, Open, The Hindu, Elle, Forbes India, Femina, Marie Claire, Tehelka and the Deccan Herald. She also wrote a weekly column for DNA (Daily News and Analysis) between 2011 and 2013. Zaidi writes a column for The Hindu and teaches journalism at the OP Jindal Global University, Sonipat.

Literary career 
Annie Zaidi's first collection of essays, Known Turf: Bantering with Bandits and Other True Tales, was short-listed for the Vodafone Crossword Book Award in 2010. Noted journalist and author P. Sainath said of the book: "The stories on dalits in the Punjab easily rank amongst the best done on the subject" and "Above all, it is the quality of the story-telling that grips you. A beautifully written book".

A collection of short stories, The Bad Boy's Guide to the Good Indian Girl, was co-authored along with Smriti Ravindra and published by Zubaan Books in 2011. Crush, a series of 50 illustrated poems (in collaboration with illustrator Gynelle Alves) was published in 2007.

Her essays, poems and short stories have appeared in several anthologies, including Dharavi: The City Within (Harper Collins India), Mumbai Noir (Akshic/Harper Collins India), Women Changing India (Zubaan); Journeys Through Rajasthan (Rupa), First Proof: 2 (Penguin India), 21 Under 40 (Zubaan), India Shining, India Changing (Tranquebar). More of her work has appeared in literary journals such as The Little Magazine, Desilit, Pratilipi, The Raleigh Review, Mint Lounge, Indian Literature (Sahitya Akademi) and Asian Cha.

In June 2012, Elle magazine named Zaidi one of the emerging South Asian writers "whose writing we believe will enrich South Asian literature". In 2015, Zaidi published an anthology called Unbound: 2,000 Years of Indian Women's Writing.

In 2019, she won the Nine Dots Prize, with a $100,000 cash award to develop her essay Bread, Cement Cactus into a book. Ashish Ghadiali of The Guardian writes the essay is a "haunting evocation of belonging and dislocation in contemporary India" that has delivered her "on to an international platform for the first time in her decade-long career."

In 2019, she published her fiction novel, Prelude to a Riot, which was short-listed for the JCB Prize for Literature.

Plays and films 
Annie's play "Untitled-1" won The Hindu Playwright Award 2018. Her play Jaal opened at Prithvi Theatre in January 2012 as part of Writers Bloc:3, a drama festival in Mumbai. Another play, So Many Socks (English), opened at the Prithvi Theatre in September 2012. It was nominated in several categories, including best script, for the META awards. The play was directed by Quasar Padamsee.

Her first full-length script, Name, Place, Animal, Thing, was shortlisted for The Hindu Metroplus Playwright Award, 2009.

A radio play, Jam, was the regional (South Asia) winner for the BBC's International Playwriting Competition 2011.

Zaidi also directed short movies, such as Ek red colour ki love story, and Ek Bahut Chhoti si Love Story.

In 2016, she directed the short film Decibel that was part of Shor Se Shuruaat, an omnibus of seven short films. She was mentored by film-maker Sriram Raghavan during the making of the movie.

Awards and honours
 2010, short-listed, Vodafone Crossword Book Award
 2018, winner, The Hindu Playwright Award
 2019, winner, Nine Dots Prize
 2020, winner, Tata Literature Live Book of the Year
 2020, short-listed, JCB Prize for Literature

Personal life 
She currently resides in Mumbai.

References 

1978 births
Living people
Indian women essayists
Indian women poets
21st-century Indian poets
21st-century Indian essayists
People from Ajmer
Writers from Rajasthan
21st-century Indian women writers
21st-century Indian writers
Women writers from Rajasthan
Indian women novelists
Indian dramatists and playwrights
Indian women dramatists and playwrights
Indian film directors
Indian women film directors
21st-century Indian journalists
Indian women journalists
Indian columnists
English-language writers from India
Twelvers
Indian Shia Muslims